

Northwest Orient Airlines Flight 307 was a scheduled international flight with several domestic legs in the United States with the routing Washington, DC–Pittsburgh-Cleveland-Detroit–Madison–Rochester–Minneapolis-St. Paul–Winnipeg. On Tuesday, March 7, 1950, a Martin 2-0-2,  registered N93050, was operating the flight when it collided with a flagpole at Fort Snelling National Cemetery on approach to Minneapolis-Saint Paul International Airport. During an attempt to make an emergency landing, a section of the left wing departed the aircraft, rendering it uncontrollable and causing it to crash into the Doughty family house in the Lynnhurst neighborhood of Minneapolis. All three crew members and ten passengers on board were killed, as were two children, Janet and Tom Doughty, and the family dog inside the house.

Background
The aircraft was a Martin 2-0-2 twin-engined piston airliner designed to carry 42 passengers. It had been delivered new to Northwest Orient Airlines on May 6, 1948, as registration N93050. The aircraft had just received a 75-hour service check in Washington, D.C., prior to departure.

On that day, Flight 307 was crewed by Captain Donald B. Jones, co-pilot William Tracy McGinn, and stewardess Mary Kennedy. Captain Jones was employed by Northwest on April 8, 1940, starting as a first officer in November 1941, and becoming qualified for the captain position on February 1, 1943. He also served as a check pilot, giving trainings in Douglas DC-3s, DC-4s, and the Martin 2-0-2, with a total of 7,619 flight hours, 988 of which were in the Martin 2-0-2.

Co-pilot McGinn was hired by Northwest on July 19, 1943, as a first officer, but served in the armed forces from April 6, 1944, to May 23, 1946. After the war, he returned to Northwest and completed captain transition training, receiving an airline transport pilot rating in December 1949, three months before the accident. His total flight hours amounted to 2,432; again, 585 of which were in the Martin 2-0-2.

Both men had recently passed physical examination tests, and prior to departure from Washington, D.C., had a rest period of 21 hours and 52 minutes.

Accident
Flight 307 took off from Washington, D.C., at 12:30 CST (18:30 UTC) on Tuesday, March 7, 1950, destined for Winnipeg, Manitoba, Canada, via Pittsburgh, Cleveland, Detroit, Madison, Rochester, and Minneapolis-Saint Paul.

The flight was delayed in Detroit by an hour and 23 minutes for a mandatory replacement of a ring seal in the hydraulic system, and departed for Madison with no issue. Shortly thereafter, Flight 307 departed for Minneapolis-Saint Paul International Airport, with a stop at Rochester being made optional, hinging upon weather conditions at the time of the flight's arrival. Indeed, when Flight 307 arrived over Rochester at 20:23 CST (02:23 UTC), it was unable to land due to light freezing rain, so the aircraft continued on toward the Twin Cities Airport in Minneapolis. 

Additionally, the tower informed the flight of two previous electrical power failures at the airport within the past hour, and that if the flight received no further communication, they should assume that it had occurred again.

Flight 307 lined up to land on Runway 35 in the blinding snowstorm conditions. The impact sheared off the top of the flagpole and crippled the aircraft's left wing.

Captain Jones put the aircraft in a slight left turn that took it over the airport tower, and radioed in saying "I have got to get in."

In the course of the climb, a  section of the left wing detached and fell near the southern foot of the Washburn Park Water Tower in the Tangletown neighborhood. Jones had just enough time to inform the tower, "We are going in--we are going in."

The aircraft continued westerly for an additional  before, at 21:02 CST (03:02 UTC), crashing almost vertically into the Doughty family house at 1116 Minnehaha Parkway West in the Lynnhurst neighborhood of Minneapolis. The aircraft and house, plus two adjacent dwellings (1110 and 1120), were destroyed by fire, and two children, 10-year-old Janet Marie and 8-year-old Thomas Edwin "Tommy" Doughty, sleeping in their beds upstairs, were killed, along with the family dog.

Their 15-year-old sister, Diane (1934–2022), narrowly escaped with their parents; the three of them were in their living room watching a Minneapolis Lakers game, and they escaped by jumping out of a window into the front yard just before their house was consumed by the fire, suffering injuries from broken glass and burns. The family dog had jumped into Diane's lap just prior to the crash, and was unable to follow the three out of the house.

Emergency response
Richfield police officer Floyd Roman was the first policeman on the scene, arriving seconds after the local fire department. Roman stated that as the inferno grew, "the plane from all the heat was melting down, and it disappeared entirely into the house."

Nearby, at the Boulevard Theater on South Lyndale Avenue, word had begun to spread that a possible plane crash had occurred. 17-year-old Dick Erdahl and two of his friends rushed to the site on foot, as emergency crews had to handle the fire as well as the diversion of traffic. Erdahl went home afterward, across Minnehaha Creek on Humboldt Avenue and later remarked, "I could see the fire from my bedroom window well into the night... If the plane had continued on its path another block or two, it could have landed on our house. That sticks in your mind."

Probable cause
The probable cause of the crash was an attempt to complete an approach with a loss of visual reference to the ground. Additionally, another Northwest flight, operated by a much larger Boeing 377, had just taken off on Runway 35 prior to Flight 307's landing attempt, and had used full engine power to blow snow off of the wings, which may have contributed to the lack of visibility approaching the runway, but this was not conclusively proven.

Legacy
This would not be the only crash that Northwest saw in 1950; three months, two weeks, and two days after, on June 23, Flight 2501 crashed into Lake Michigan with the loss of all 58 aboard, the deadliest commercial airliner accident in the country at the time.

In total, between August 1948 and January 1951, five of Northwest's 25 Martin 2-0-2's suffered fatal accidents, with an overall death toll of 89. Subsequently, Northwest withdrew all 2-0-2s from service at midnight on March 17, 1951, ten days after the one-year-anniversary of the crash of Flight 307. The remaining twenty planes were sold or leased to local service airlines. Northwest never operated the Martin 2-0-2 again.

Former Minneapolis councilman Mark Kaplan had known about the crash, having moved to the Lynnhurst neighborhood, and after the dedication of a memorial to the victims of the collapse of the I-35W Mississippi River bridge in downtown Minneapolis on August 1, 2007, decided that the victims of Flight 307 should be memorialized as well. With help from surviving family members of the passengers and crew, he made a successful push for a memorial on the site, across the street from the site of the Doughty family home, which Diane found "wonderful". Raising $3,500 USD for a  boulder and cast aluminum plaque, the memorial was formally dedicated on August 27, 2011, with Diane and surviving family members present. The address of the rebuilt house on the site of the Doughty family house was changed after the crash from 1116 to 1114 Minnehaha Parkway West.

References
Citations

Bibliography

External links
 Report from the Civil Aeronautics Board (PDF)

Aviation accidents and incidents in the United States in 1950
Airliner accidents and incidents in Minnesota
Accidents and incidents involving the Martin 2-0-2
Airliner accidents and incidents caused by pilot error
1950 in Minnesota
History of Minneapolis
307
March 1950 events in the United States
Minneapolis–Saint Paul International Airport